Acacia jackesiana, also known as Betsy's wattle, is a shrub belonging to the genus Acacia and the subgenus Juliflorae that is native to north eastern Australia.

It is named for the botanist Dr Betsy Jackes (1935–), a professor at the James Cook University of North Queensland.

Description
Like most species of Acacia it has phyllodes rather than true leaves. The phyllodes are made up of overlapping scaly lobes and have one dominant nerve at each angle with a total of 8 to 12 nerves. It blooms from July and October producing yellow flowers. The cylindrical flower-spikes have a length of  packed with golden coloured flowers. The sub-woody, glabrous seed pods that form after flowering are linear and tapered at each end.

Distribution

See also
List of Acacia species

References

jackesiana
Flora of Queensland
Plants described in 1987
Taxa named by Leslie Pedley